Wyoming Highway 585 (WYO 585) is a  north-south Wyoming State Road located in Weston and  Crook counties in northeastern Wyoming.

Route description 
Wyoming Highway 585 starts it south end at US 85 in Four Corners, and from there, travels north-northwest through the northeastern corner of Weston County and into Crook County. WYO 585 ends a half mile later at I-90 Business/US 14 (Cleveland Street).

History 
WYO 585 was commissioned in 1933 and has kept its original alignment since then. In 1933, US 85 had four US auxiliary routes: US 185, US 285, US 385, and US 485. It was possible that planners wanted WYO 585 to be made into US 585, however, that never happened.

Major intersections

References

External links 

Wyoming State Routes 500-789
US 14 in Wyoming Jct list

Transportation in Weston County, Wyoming
Transportation in Crook County, Wyoming
585